Alpine meadow most often refers to:

Alpine meadow or alpine tundra, a type of vegetated natural habitat at high altitude

Alpine meadow or alpine meadows may also refer to:

Places

United Kingdom
Alpine Meadow, Berkhamsted, a Site of Special Scientific Interest (SSSI) in Hertfordshire, England

United States
 Alpine Meadows, California, an unincorporated community in California
 Alpine Meadows Lodge, outside Golden, British Columbia
 Alpine Meadows Ranch, designed by Frank Lloyd Wright in Darby, Montana
 Alpine Meadows (ski resort) a ski resort in the Lake Tahoe Area of California

Botany
Thalictrum alpinum, a species of flowering plant sometimes known as the alpine meadow-rue

See also
Meadow
Montane meadow